Pope Air Force Base Historic District is a national historic district located at Fayetteville, Cumberland County, North Carolina.  It encompasses 32 contributing buildings on the grounds of Pope Air Force Base.  They were built in 1933-1934 during the first base expansion and include single administrative buildings and dwellings with associated outbuildings. Notable buildings include the three-story, Georgian Revival style Fleming Hall; the Old Fire Station; and 21 Old Family Housing Units.

It was listed on the National Register of Historic Places in 1991.

References

Military facilities on the National Register of Historic Places in North Carolina
Historic districts on the National Register of Historic Places in North Carolina
Georgian Revival architecture in North Carolina
Buildings and structures in Fayetteville, North Carolina
National Register of Historic Places in Cumberland County, North Carolina